Kentu Malcolm Badu, known as Malcolm Badu (born 23 June 1997) is a German professional footballer who plays as a defensive midfielder for Energie Cottbus.

Club career
After beginning his club career in the lower German divisions, Badu signed with the Russian Premier League club FC Spartak Moscow on 10 July 2019.

He made his debut in the Russian Football National League for FC Spartak-2 Moscow on 24 July 2019 in a game against FC Nizhny Novgorod.

In January 2021, his contract with Spartak was terminated by mutual consent.

Badu joined Regionalliga Nordost club Energie Cottbus in July 2021, following a trial.

International career
Badu represented Germany at the 2017 FIFA U-20 World Cup.

References

External links
 
 
 Profile by Russian Football National League

Living people
1997 births
German footballers
Footballers from Berlin
Association football midfielders
Germany youth international footballers
VfL Wolfsburg II players
FC Spartak Moscow players
FC Spartak-2 Moscow players
FC Energie Cottbus players
Regionalliga players
German expatriate footballers
German expatriate sportspeople in Russia
Expatriate footballers in Russia